Fang Zhiyuan (3 September 1939 – 20 January 2023) was a Chinese engineer in the fields of genetic breeding, and an academician of the Chinese Academy of Engineering.

Fang was a member of the 9th and 10th National Committee of the Chinese People's Political Consultative Conference.

Biography
Fang was born in Hengyang, Hunan, on 3 September 1939. He attended . In 1960, he was admitted to Wuhan University, where he graduated in 1964.

After university, Fang was despatched to the Institute of Vegetables and Flowers, Chinese Academy of Agricultural Sciences, where he moved up the ranks to become director in 1995. He joined the Chinese Communist Party (CCP) in 1980.

On 20 January 2023, he died in Beijing, at the age of 83.

Honours and awards
 1991 State Science and Technology Progress Award (Second Class) for breeding of new cabbage varieties "Zhonggan 8" and "Zhonggan 11"
 1995 Member of the Chinese Academy of Engineering (CAE)
 1996 Science and Technology Progress Award of the Ho Leung Ho Lee Foundation
 1998 State Science and Technology Progress Award (Second Class) for breeding of a new early-maturing spring cabbage variety "8398"
 2014 State Science and Technology Progress Award (Second Class) for establishment of breeding technology system and breeding of new varieties of male sterile line in cabbage

References

1939 births
2023 deaths
People from Hengyang
Engineers from Hunan
Wuhan University alumni
Members of the Chinese Academy of Engineering
20th-century Chinese engineers
21st-century Chinese engineers
Members of the 9th Chinese People's Political Consultative Conference
Members of the 10th Chinese People's Political Consultative Conference